Jorge Castañeda Gutman (born May 24, 1953) is a Mexican politician and academic who served as Secretary of Foreign Affairs (2000–2003).

He also authored more than a dozen books, including  a biography of Che Guevara, and he regularly contributes to newspapers such as Reforma (Mexico), El País (Spain), Los Angeles Times (USA) and Newsweek magazine. He was elected to the American Philosophical Society in 2008.

Early life and education 
Castañeda was born in Mexico City.  His father was Jorge Castañeda y Álvarez de la Rosa who served as Secretary of Foreign Affairs (1979–1982), during the administration of José López Portillo.

He received the French Baccalauréat from the Lycée Franco-Mexicain in Mexico City. He graduated with an AB in history from Princeton University in 1973 after completing a 241-page long senior thesis titled "The Movement of the Revolutionary Left in Chile: 1965-1972." Then after receiving his PhD in Economic History from the University of Paris (Panthéon-La Sorbonne) he worked as a professor at several universities, including the National Autonomous University of Mexico, the University of California, Berkeley, Princeton University, New York University, and the University of Cambridge. He was a Bernard Schwartz fellow at The New America Foundation.

He was married to Miriam Morales (a Chilean citizen) and he has one son, Jorge Andrés.

Academic books 
Among his books is Utopia Unarmed: The Latin American Left After the Cold War (Vintage Books, 1993), an assessment of leftist politics in Latin America. The book has had a wide readership for its sometimes controversial overview of left-leaning politics in the region post-1990. Its main theme is a shift from politics based on the Cuban Revolution to politics based on broad-based new social movements, from armed revolutions to elections.

Another of Castañeda's well-known works is Compañero: The Life and Death of Che Guevara, which analyzes the Argentine Marxist revolutionary.

Political career 
Castañeda's political career began as a member of the Mexican Communist Party but he has since  moved to the political center. He served as an advisor to Cuauhtémoc Cárdenas during his (failed) presidential campaign in 1988 and advised Vicente Fox during his (successful) presidential campaign in 2000.

After winning the election, Fox appointed Castañeda as his Secretary of Foreign Affairs.

Following a number of disagreements with other cabinet members Castañeda left the post in January 2003 and began traveling around the country, giving lectures and promoting his ideas. In July 2003, United Nations Secretary-General Kofi Annan appointed him to the United Nations Commission on the Private Sector and Development, which was co-chaired by Prime Minister Paul Martin of Canada and former President Ernesto Zedillo of Mexico.

Presidential candidacy
On March 25, 2004, Castañeda officially announced his presidential campaign by means of a prime-time campaign advertisement carried in all major Mexican television stations. He presented himself as an independent "citizens' candidate", a move contrary to Mexico's electoral law that gives registered parties alone the right to nominate candidates for election.

In 2004, Castañeda started to seek Court authorization to run in the country's 2006 presidential election without the endorsement of any of the registered political parties. In August 2005 the Supreme Court ruled against Castañeda's appeal.  The ruling essentially put an end to Castañeda's bid to run as an independent candidate; however, soon after this ruling he took his case to the Inter-American Court of Human Rights in order to defend his political rights; in 2008 the IACHR found that the State violated the American Convention on Human Rights and ordered major electoral reform in the country.

Later career
In 2014, UN Secretary-General Ban Ki-moon appointed Castañeda as co-chair of a commission of inquiry to investigate human rights abuses in the Central African Republic, alongside Fatimata M'Baye and Bernard Acho Muna; within two months, however, Castañeda resigned from the position.

Articles 
He has published articles in Newsweek. In 2009, he published a theory about the 2009 dismissals by Raúl Castro, suggesting that Hugo Chávez was plotting a coup in Cuba due to concerns that Raul Castro would make concessions that would betray the Cuban Revolution. He has an article in the September–October 2010 issue of Foreign Affairs entitled "Not Ready for Prime Time". He also writes regularly for Project Syndicate.

Bibliography 
 Nicaragua: Contradicciones en la Revolución (1980)
 Los últimos capitalismos. El capital financiero: México y los "nuevos países industrializados" (1982)
 México: El futuro en juego (1987)
 Limits on friendship: United States and Mexico (1989), co-authored with Robert A. Pastor
 La casa por la ventana (1993)
 The Mexican Shock (1995)
 Utopia unarmed (1995)
 The Estados Unidos Affair. Cinco ensayos sobre un "amor" oblicuo (1996)
 La vida en Rojo, una biografía del Ché Guevara (1997)
 La Herencia. Arqueología de la sucesión presidencial en México (1999)
 Somos Muchos: Ideas para el Mañana (2004)
 Ex Mex (2008)
 Mañana Forever?: Mexico and the Mexicans (2011)
 America through Foreign Eyes (2020)

See also 
 2006 Mexican general election

References

External links 

 NYU: Voices of Latin American Leaders
 Profile at The New America Foundation
 The Right Deal on Cuba by Jorge Castañeda, The Wall Street Journal, April 20, 2009
 How Fidel Snookered Everyone by Jorge Castañeda, Newsweek, May 4, 2009 issue
 Adios, Monroe Doctrine: When the Yanquis Go Home by Jorge G. Castañeda, The New Republic, December 28, 2009
 Video: Does Che Guevara Still Matter? interview with biographer Jorge Castañeda
 Castañeda on the Drug War, Legalization, Immigration and Free Trade - video interview by Democracy Now!

1953 births
Living people
Jewish Mexican politicians
Latin Americanists
Mexican democracy activists
Mexican diplomats
Mexican economists
Mexican Secretaries of Foreign Affairs
Mexican people of Belarusian-Jewish descent
Academic staff of the National Autonomous University of Mexico
New York University faculty
People from Mexico City
University of Paris alumni
Princeton University alumni
University of California, Berkeley faculty
Mexican columnists
International relations scholars
Mexican expatriates in the United States
Mexican expatriates in France